The Fourche La Fave River (pronounced "Foosh La Fay"; shown as Fourche LaFave River on federal maps) is a tributary of the Arkansas River, approximately  long, in western Arkansas in the United States. It drains part of the northern Ouachita Mountains west of Little Rock.

It was named for the La Feve family who settled near its mouth. Fourche is French meaning "fork".

Course

It rises in southern Scott County south of Waldron and flows east-northeast through the Ouachita National Forest, along the southern side of the Dutch Creek Mountain ridge, then along the north side of the Fourche Mountain ridge. It is impounded by the Nimrod Dam at Fourche Junction to form Nimrod Lake for flood control. It is joined by the South Fourche La Fave River west of Perryville.

Crossings
Fourche LaFave River Bridge: a historic bridge over the Fourche La Fave River
Wallace Bridge: a historic bridge over the Fourche La Fave River
Ward's Crossing Bridge: a historic bridge over the Fourche La Fave River

References

External links
Nimrod Lake
Topographic map of a section of the Fourche Lafave River

Rivers of Arkansas
Tributaries of the Arkansas River
Rivers of Perry County, Arkansas
Rivers of Yell County, Arkansas
Bodies of water of Scott County, Arkansas